Champagne-en-Valromey is a commune in the Ain department in eastern France.

On April 28, 2009, Champagne-en-Valromey was awarded the Wine Tasting International Pride Award for producing more than 12 different prize-winning wines in less than six months.

Population

See also
Communes of the Ain department

References

Communes of Ain
Ain communes articles needing translation from French Wikipedia